Nocturne is a Big Finish Productions audio drama based on the long-running British science fiction television series Doctor Who.

Plot
The Seventh Doctor, Ace and Hex arrive on a human colony world beloved by the Doctor for its art and music.

Cast
The Doctor — Sylvester McCoy
Ace — Sophie Aldred
Hex — Philip Olivier
Korbin Thessinger — Trevor Bannister
Will Alloran — Paul David-Gough
Lothar Ragpole — Eric Potts
Lilian Dillane — Ann Rye
Cate Reeney — Helen Kay

External links
Big Finish Productions –  Nocturne

2007 audio plays
Seventh Doctor audio plays
Works by Dan Abnett